Chonburi Football Club is a Thai professional football club based in the city of Chonburi, Chonburi province, that competes in the top division in Thai football, the Thai League 1. The team lifted the league title in 2007 which became the most successful season in their history.

Chonburi were founded in 1997 and their main rivals are Sriracha who are also based in Chonburi Province. The team is widely known by their nickname "The Sharks" which can be seen in the crest of the club.

History

Early years 
In its early years, Chonburi Football Club was Assumption College Sriracha's football team. The team was managed by Annop Singtothong, Thanasak Suraprasert, Sontaya Khunpluem, and Wittaya Khunpluem. The team competed and were victorious in many youth tournaments, one of them including the Institute of Physical Education's youth football tournament.

In 1996, Sannibat Samut Prakan Association competed in the Khǒr Royal Cup and came in second place. The directors of the football team then negotiated for a merger which resulted in the creation of Chonburi-Sannibat Samut Prakan Football Club. The team then competed in Thai Division 1 League or Thai League 2 today.

Provincial League 
Later, the Chonburi Sports Association had been given the chance to compete in the Provincial League in 2000. As a result, Chonburi's provincial football team was separated from Chonburi-Sannibat Samut Prakan Football Club which competed in Thai Division 1 League. The team that competed in the Provincial League acquired their players from Assumption College Sriracha and 	Chulabhon's College Chonburi. They ended their first season in the Provincial League in third place.

First major successes

In 2005 they won the Provincial League title by beating Nakhon Ratchasima at the Nakhon Ratchasima Municipal Stadium, and gained promotion to the Thai Premier League in the 2006 season with the Provincial League runners up, Suphanburi. This title was the first major success of the club. Chonburi then finished 8th in the 2006 Thai Premier League season.

In 2006 they were invited to play in the Singapore Cup and reached the final, defeating local sides Home United, Albirex Niigata Singapore and Balestier Khalsa along the way. In the final they lost to Tampines Rovers 2–3 in the extra time after leading 2–0.

In 2007 they were again invited to participate in the Singapore Cup, but were defeated in the first round against Balestier Khalsa, in a replay of the previous season's semi-finals. Chonburi lost 3–2 in normal play. They have formed links with Manchester City. In the end of this season Chonburi become Thailand Premier League champions for 2007 Thailand Premier League, This was the first trophy in major league for the club and head coach Jadet Meelarp got Coach of the Year awards and Pipob On-Mo got Player of the year awards.

In July 2008 they made another important big step into the future. In addition, the previous sponsor, Hemaraj Land and Development PLC signed a major sponsorship deal which comes into force from 2009. The contract will run for three years and will amount to the sum of 18 million baht (about 350,000 Euros). This may indeed be the largest completed sponsorship of a Thai football club which was ever completed.

At the end of the 2008 season, there was only enough for runner-up. The main reason for this was certainly the profligacy. With two games left in the season you still on the first place in the table, but a 0–0 draw against Samut Songkhram made to naught in the penultimate round of the dream title defense. Jadet Meelarp was dismissed. His successor is officially announced in mid-December 2008. Kiatisuk Senamuang, known as Zico, was appointed coach of Chonburi.

As Runner-up Champion 2008 the team is qualified for the 2009 AFC Cup and was drawn in a group with Hanoi ACB (Vietnam), Eastern AA (Hong Kong) and Kedah FA (Malaysia). Chonburi has to call to mind the Zeil set to be first in the group and win the AFC Cup in Thailand. The group stage was confident survived with only one defeat in six games. In the second round Chonburi PSMS Medan in Indonesia defeated 4–1 before retired in the quarter-finals against the Vietnam representative Bình Dương 2–4. The game against Medan was also the last game of Surat Sukha, who moved to Melbourne Victory.

In July 2009. End of the 2009 season the club was only the runner-up again. At the end of 2008 they had 2 points behind the champions, 2009, there were 3 points. Kiatisuk Senamuang changed at the end of the season to Hoàng Anh Gia Lai, the association in Vietnam where he was active as a player last. His successor in Chonburi was Jadet Meelarp, which had been released a year earlier. At his side, his former boss Witthaya Laohakul was provided as technical director of the club. Unlike other top clubs in the league but vorzuweisen Chonburi had hardly known commitments for the 2010 season. Only Therdsak Chaiman you can probably fit into this category. The 36-year-old was last in the Thailand national football team his comeback from Singapore and moved to Chonburi. Although the club was again runner-up, but this is not automatically eligible in the 2009 season to participate in the 2010 AFC Cup. Instead, the Cup Winners' Cup in Thailand directly qualified for the competition. Already in the second round of the Thai FA Cup retired from the Chonburi.

Asian competitions

In 2008, in the first AFC Champions League, Chonburi played against the Japanese champions Gamba Osaka. On 20 March 2008 the club achieved its first victory in the AFC Champions League against Melbourne Victory. The game was clouded by controversy when Melbourne Victory scored their only goal whilst a Chonburi FC player was down injured and his teammates were calling for the ball to be played off the park. It mattered little when Cameroonian striker Baga scored a goal from 35 yards out and then followed it up with a second goal in extra time to condemn the Melbourne Victory to their first loss in the competition 3–1.

Academy & youth program

Chonburi is well known for producing football talent as well as using their youth players in the first team. In the 2007 Thailand Premier League in which they have been crowned champions, over 80% of their first-team players came from their youth program. However, in the past, their youth players stayed at boarding schools in Chonburi province such as Assumption College Sriracha and Chulabhon's College Chonburi.

Today Chonburi has a football academy where academy players train and live every day at. The idea of creating a football academy was spearheaded by former Chonburi head coach and current technical director Witthaya Laohakul, who stressed the importance of creating and producing quality football players for the first-team. In 2009, Chonburi decided to remodel its academy and youth program by building an actual football academy in Ban Bueng District. The new academy is located far away from Chonburi surrounded by paddy fields and was once rented out to JMG Academy. In addition, this new football academy includes a dormitory and football training facilities for the academy players.

Chonburi recruits academy players by scouting them from tournaments as well as offering trials. Worachit Kanitsribampen is one of the first successful players to come out of Chonburi's newly restructured academy.

Notable Youth Graduates

Affiliated clubs
 Vissel Kobe (2012)
Chonburi announced a business partnership between Vissel Kobe of the J1 League in 2012. The deal will facilitate player and staff exchanges both at the professional and youth level, as well as friendly matches, the creation of new football schools, and marketing opportunities.

Continental record

Stadium

At the start of the 2008 season, Chonburi used the Chonburi Municipality Stadium plays in the 5,000-seater in Chonburi. Due to disagreements with the local authorities, the club wore its home games from 2008 of the Princess Sirindhorn Stadium. For the games of the 2008 AFC Champions League you had to dodge into the National Stadium, which was also used for matches in the 2009 AFC Cup Bangkok. For the 2010 season, the club will return to Chonburi and will host its home games at the renovated Chonburi Sports College Stadium.

In 2010 season they moved to IPE Chonburi Stadium.

In 2011 season they move to Chonburi Stadium after renovate the stadium for played in the AFC Cup, and Thai League.

For the future, a new stadium is designed with modern training facilities. The new stadium will have 15,000 spectators and meet modern demands. It would be next to the new buildings in Pattaya and one of the most modern stadiums in Si Racha in Chonburi province. Arise should the stadium with club grounds near Bang Saen on a ten-rai area. This is about 1.5 hectares. The site was donated by the President of the Association, Wittaya Khunpluem.

Stadium and locations

Season by season record

P = Played
W = Games won
D = Games drawn
L = Games lost
F = Goals for
A = Goals against
Pts = Points
Pos = Final position

TL = Thai League
T1 = Thai League 1

DQ = Disqualified
QR1 = First Qualifying Round
QR2 = Second Qualifying Round
QR3 = Third Qualifying Round
QR4 = Fourth Qualifying Round
RInt = Intermediate Round
R1 = Round 1
R2 = Round 2
R3 = Round 3

R4 = Round 4
R5 = Round 5
R6 = Round 6
GR = Group stage
QF = Quarter-finals
SF = Semi-finals
RU = Runners-up
S = Shared
W = Winners

Players

Current squad

Out on loan

Former players
For details on former players, see List of Chonburi F.C. players and :Category:Chonburi F.C. players.

Club officials

Manager history
Manager by Years (2004–present)

  Witthaya Laohakul 
  Jadet Meelarp  
  Kiatisuk Senamuang 
  Jadet Meelarp 
  Witthaya Laohakul 
  Masahiro Wada 
  Jadet Meelarp 
  Therdsak Chaiman 
  Goran Barjaktarević 
  Jukkapant Punpee  
  Sasom Pobprasert

Honours

Domestic competitions

League
Thai League 1
 Winners (1): 2007
 Runners-up (5): 2008, 2009, 2011, 2012, 2014
Provincial League:
 Winners (1): 2005

Cups
FA Cup
 Winners (2): 2010, 2016
 Runners-up (2): 2014, 2020–21
Kor Royal Cup:
 Winners (4): 2007, 2009, 2011, 2012

International competitions
AFC Champions League: 1 appearances
 2008: Group stage
AFC Cup: 3 appearances
 2009: Quarter-finals
 2011: Quarter-finals
 2012: Semi-finals

References

External links
 

 Official Website 

 
Thai League 1 clubs
Football clubs in Thailand
Sport in Chonburi province
Association football clubs established in 1997
1997 establishments in Thailand